Gulfran Támara (born 2 February 1996) is a Colombian footballer who plays as a central defender for Bolivian club Destroyer's.

External links

1996 births
Living people
Colombian footballers
Categoría Primera A players
Barranquilla F.C. footballers
Atlético Junior footballers
Association football central defenders
Footballers from Barranquilla
21st-century Colombian people